Rinsey Croft is a hamlet in southwest Cornwall, England, United Kingdom.

References

Hamlets in Cornwall